Gbenga Bareehu Ashafa  (born 22 July 1955) is a Nigerian politician who is the current Managing Director/Chief Executive Officer of the Federal Housing Authority of Nigeria, appointed by President Muhammadu Buhari in August 2020. He was previously a senator representing Lagos East Senatorial District.

Ashafa is a member of the All Progressives Congress and serves as a member of the National Executive Committee of the All Progressives Congress as well as the Vice Chairman (South West) of the Southern Senators Forum.

Childhood and education
Olugbenga Bareehu Ashafa was born in the Luther/Bamgbose/Campos area of Lagos Island on 22 July 1955. He is the second child of a commodity merchant Lawal Kakanfo Ashafa, and a textile and gold merchant Tesmot Ojuolape Elemoro.

The young Ashafa started his education at Christ Church Cathedral Primary School, Broad Street, Lagos in 1961, and graduated 1968. He attended CMS Grammar School, Lagos and graduated in 1973

Ashafa then went on to study Biological Sciences at Morgan State University, Maryland, USA earning a Bachelor of Science degree (Cum Laude) in June 1978. He earned a Masters of Science degree in Public Health Administration from the University of Tennessee, Knoxville in 1979.

Political campaign and governance
In 1998, Ashafa worked with a political group towards the emergence of then Senator Bola Ahmed Tinubu as the Alliance for Democracy gubernatorial candidate for Lagos State. He also worked on Senator Tinubu’s successful campaign for Governor of Lagos State, as one of the campaign coordinators for Kosofe LGA. Subsequently, as a co-opted member of the governor-elect’s transition team, he provided the blueprint for the local government reforms of the Tinubu administration.

At the start of Nigeria’s Fourth Republic, Ashafa joined the Tinubu administration in September 1999 as Director of Planning, Governor’s Office in charge of local government administration. In this role, he effectively coordinated the activities of local government areas in the State; acting as the liaison between the Governor’s Office and Local Government Chairmen across the State.

In January 2001, Ashafa was appointed Executive Secretary, Lagos State Land Use and Allocation Committee. In this role, he was responsible for land allocation and management in Lagos State.

Ashafa was appointed Permanent Secretary, Lagos State Lands Bureau in February 2005.

Senator of the Federal Republic of Nigeria

7th Session (2011–2015)

Ashafa was elected to the Senate of the Federal Republic of Nigeria as the ACN candidate from Lagos East in April 2011. He won the election with 222,439 votes, 69% of votes cast. He was sworn in as a senator on 6 June 2011. In his first term, Ashafa the Vice-Chairman, Senate Committee on Lands, Housing and Urban Development. He was also a member of the following Senate committees: Environment and Ecology Committee, Committee on Federal Character and Inter-Governmental Relations, Gas Committee, and Senate Services Committee.

8th Session (2015–2019)

Ashafa was inaugurated as a second-term senator representing the Lagos East Senatorial District in the 8th senate on 9 June 2015. He is also a member of the National Executive Committee of the All Progressives Congress as well as the Vice Chairman (South West) of the Southern Senators Forum.

In 2018,Senator Ashafa lost the bid to return to the Senate for a third term on the platform of the All Progressives Congress.

Joint Conference Committees
 Senate Joint committee on Land Transport, Marine Transport and Aviation – Chairman
 Conference committee of the Senate on the Nigerian Railway Authority Bill – Chairman

Committee Work

Since his appointment as the chairman of the Senate Committee on Land Transport, Ashafa has set the pace for the provision of legislative support to the executive in achieving the complete turnaround of the railway sector in Nigeria.

Family life
Senator Ashafa has been married to Folashade Omobola Ashafa (née Edun) since 1979. He is Muslim and his wife is Christian. Bashir Tosin Ashafa fondly known as BTA to friends and associate, is one of his sons.

References

1955 births
Living people
Politicians from Lagos
Yoruba politicians
Morgan State University alumni
University of Tennessee alumni
Alliance for Democracy (Nigeria) politicians
All Progressives Congress politicians
Members of the Senate (Nigeria)
Nigerian Muslims
CMS Grammar School, Lagos alumni
Members of the Lagos State House of Assembly
Nigerian expatriates in the United States
Lagos State politicians